Toney Lee is an American singer, songwriter and producer, best known for his club hit "Reach Up". It reached up for the position No. 8 on the US Billboard Dance chart.

Career
Toney Lee's first and best known hit, "Reach Up", reached No. 8 on the US Billboard Dance chart. "Reach Up" also charted at No. 64 on the UK Singles Chart in January 1983. Later in 1983, Lee recorded his second single "Love So Deep" for Radar Records. While not as successful as his first single, it had a relatively strong performance on the dance charts as well, reaching No. 22 on the US Billboard Dance chart. Both tracks were produced and written by Eric Matthew (best known for his work for musicians like Gary's Gang, Sharon Redd and Sinnamon) and Lee.

In 1985, his song "Teaser" reached No. 64 on the US Billboard R&B chart. A further release, "My Baby Loves Me" charted at No. 41 on the US Dance chart in October 1987.

Discography

Albums
Teaser (Critique, 1986)

Singles

"Reach Up"

References

External links
 Discogs Page

Living people
Musicians from New York (state)
21st-century African-American male singers
American garage house musicians
American dance musicians
American boogie musicians
Year of birth missing (living people)